Renaissance is the ninth solo studio album by American musician Marcus Miller. It was released on May 28, 2012 through Concord Jazz. Recording sessions took place at Sear Sound in New York City with additional recording at Hannibal Studio in Santa Monica and at the Music Shed in New Orleans. The album features contributions from Dr. John on vocals, Federico González Peña, Kris Bowers and Bobby Sparks on keyboards, Adam Rogers, Adam Agati and Paul Jackson Jr. on guitar, Louis Cato on drums, Ramon Yslas on percussion, Alex Han on alto saxophone, Maurice Brown and Sean Jones on trumpet, with guest appearances from Gretchen Parlato and Rubén Blades.

Reception
Phil Wein of No Treble stated "This is definitely one of Marcus Miller’s best solo records and is an essential release for his fans and highly recommended for listeners who what to more occasionally get a taste of where Marcus is at. It’s not music to challenge a jazz audience with improvisation at the frontiers of sound, but you knew that. What it is: natural sounding music with intensity and groove designed to make an audience feel good. It’s funky music very well written and beautifully arranged. It’s smooth, soulful jazz. It’s deeply grooving music that combines jazz, funk, Brazilian and other influences effortlessly. It’s Marcus Miller at his best". 
S. Victor Aaron of Something Else! commented "Renaissance isn’t a revolutionary album, but there’s an attention to detail, the openness to a multitude of styles, and Miller’s strongest set of songs in some time. All of those things seemed to inspire the younger generation of players in his band to play up to the material and respond to Miller’s direction with a rare combination of looseness and preciseness. Where those guys go from here, that’s where the real rebirth will happen".

Track listing

Personnel 

 William Henry Marcus Miller Jr. – bass (tracks: 1-4, 6-13), bass clarinet (tracks: 5, 10), acoustic & fretless bass (track 5), producer, additional recording, executive producer, liner notes
 Rubén Blades Bellido de Luna – vocals (track 5)
 Gretchen Parlato – vocals (track 5)
 Malcolm John Rebennack – vocals (track 12)
 Kristopher Bowers – Fender Rhodes electric piano (tracks: 1, 11), piano (tracks: 1, 4)
 Federico González Peña – Fender Rhodes electric piano (tracks: 2, 5, 9), piano (tracks: 3, 5-8, 10)
 Bobby Ray Sparks II – organ (tracks: 4, 6, 9), clavinet (track 9)
 Adam Agati – guitar (tracks: 1, 7, 8, 11, 12)
 Adam Rogers – guitar (tracks: 2, 4, 6, 9), acoustic guitar (tracks: 3, 10)
 Paul Milton Jackson, Jr. – guitar (track 11)
 Louis Cato – drums (tracks: 1-12), djembe (track 3), congas (track 11)
 Ramon Yslas – percussion (tracks: 4, 5, 7, 8)
 Alex Han – alto saxophone (tracks: 1-12)
 Maurice "Mobetta" Brown – trumpet (tracks: 1, 3, 4, 11)
 Sean Jones – trumpet (tracks: 2, 4, 6, 9)
Technical
 Harold Goode – associate producer, executive producer
 Harry Martin Jr. – executive producer
 David Isaac – mixing (tracks: 1-8, 11)
 Taka Honda – mixing (tracks: 10, 12, 13), additional recording
 Bruce A. Miller – mixing (track 9)
 Chris Allen – recording
 Chris Finney – additional recording
 Kevin Harper – assistant engineer
 George Shaw – assistant engineer
 Darcy Proper – mastering
 Jack Frisch – art direction & design
 Mathieu Zazzo – photography
 Josh Semolik – photography
 Bibi Green – photography, management

Chart history

References

External links 

2012 albums
Marcus Miller albums
Albums produced by Marcus Miller